Pomatoschistus is a genus of gobies native to fresh, brackish and marine waters of Europe, the eastern Atlantic Ocean and the Mediterranean Sea.

Species
There are currently 13 recognized species in this genus:
 Pomatoschistus anatoliae Engin & Innal, 2017
 Pomatoschistus bathi P. J. Miller, 1982 (Bath's goby)
 Pomatoschistus canestrinii (A. P. Ninni, 1883) (Canestrini's goby)
 Pomatoschistus knerii (Steindachner, 1861) (Kner's goby)
 Pomatoschistus lozanoi (F. de Buen, 1923) (Lozano's goby)
 Pomatoschistus marmoratus (A. Risso, 1810) (Marbled goby)
 Pomatoschistus microps (Krøyer, 1838) (Common goby)
 Pomatoschistus minutus (Pallas, 1770) (Sand goby)
 Pomatoschistus montenegrensis P. J. Miller & Šanda, 2008
 Pomatoschistus norvegicus (Collett, 1902) (Norway goby)
 Pomatoschistus pictus (Malm, 1865) (Painted goby)
 Pomatoschistus quagga (Heckel, 1837) (Quagga goby)
 Pomatoschistus tortonesei P. J. Miller, 1969 (Tortonese's goby)

References

 
Gobiinae
Ray-finned fish genera
 
 
Taxa named by Theodore Gill
Taxonomy articles created by Polbot